Pac-Man is a 30-minute Saturday morning American animated series produced by Hanna-Barbera Productions and based on the Namco video game franchise of the same title. It premiered on ABC and ran for 44 episodes over two seasons from September 25, 1982, to November 5, 1983. It was the first cartoon based on a video game.

It was the highest-rated Saturday morning cartoon show in the US during late 1982. Upon its debut, it was watched by an audience of over  children in the US, in addition to adults.

Plot 
The show follows the adventures of the title character, Pac-Man, his wife Pepper Pac-Man (Ms. Pac-Man), their child Pac-Baby, their dog Chomp-Chomp and their cat Sour Puss. The family lives in Pac-Land, a place in which the geography and architecture seem to revolve primarily around sphere-like shapes. Most episodes of the series center around the ongoing battle between the Pac family and their only known enemies, the Ghost Monsters: Blinky, Inky, Pinky, Clyde, and Sue. They work for Mezmaron, whose sole mission is to locate and control the source of "Power Pellets", which serve as the primary food and power source for the city, and also is the deus ex machina in virtually every episode. The second (and final) season later introduces Super-Pac and Pac-Man's teenage cousin P.J.

Influence 
The show's initial success inspired ABC's rival CBS to create Saturday Supercade, which featured other video game characters from the golden age of video arcade games.

Some of the next Namco games were based on or influenced from the cartoon. Pac-Land and Pac-Man 2: The New Adventures are major examples. Also, the Tengen release of the original Pac-Man arcade game for the Nintendo Entertainment System features box art based on the cartoon.

Controversy 

As the first season aired, scenes of Pac-Man "chomping" the Ghost Monsters and being "chomped" himself were considered too "violent".  These scenes were toned down in subsequent episodes to provide less direct scenes of the characters "chomping" one another.

Voice cast

Main 

 Marty Ingels – Pac-Man
 Barbara Minkus – Pepper (Ms. Pac-Man)
 Russi Taylor – Pac-Baby
 Allan Lurie – Mezmaron
 Neil Ross – Clyde
 Susan Silo – Sue
 Barry Gordon – Inky
 Chuck McCann – Blinky, Pinky
 Peter Cullen – Sour Puss
 Frank Welker – Chomp-Chomp, Morris, Adult Pac-Baby
 Darryl Hickman – P.J. (Season 2)
 Julie McWhirter – Dinky (two episodes from seasons 1 and 2)
 Lorenzo Music – Super-Pac (Season 2)

Additionals 

 Bill Callaway (Season 2)
 Jodi Carlisle (Season 1)
 Brian Cummings (Season 2)
 Patrick Fraley (Season 2)
 Joan Gerber (Season 2)
 Arte Johnson (Season 2)
 Paul Kirby
 Chris Latta (Season 2)
 Kris Stevens (Season 2)
 Andre Stojka (Season 2)
 Janet Waldo (Season 2)
 Lennie Weinrib (Season 1) – Pacula (ep. 7)

Episodes

Season 1 (1982) 
Aired as part of The Pac-Man/Little Rascals/Richie Rich Show

Season 2 (1983) 
Aired as part of The Pac-Man/Rubik, the Amazing Cube Hour.

Specials

Pac-Man Halloween Special 
The Halloween special consisted of two segments from the show, "Pacula" and "Trick or Chomp". The special aired in primetime on ABC on October 30, 1982. It has been replayed on channels like Cartoon Network and Boomerang during Halloween in recent years.

Christmas Comes to Pac-Land 
In this Christmas special, Pac-Man and his family help Santa Claus (voiced by Peter Cullen) after he crash lands in Pac-Land (after the reindeer were startled by the floating eyes of the Ghost Monsters after Pac-Man, Ms. Pac-Man and Pac-Baby chomped them). Mezmeron was the only character from the cartoon that is not in the special (although his lair, which is covered in snow, appears). It is shown every December on the Boomerang Christmas Party.

Broadcast history 
Pac-Man aired on ABC Saturday Morning in the following formats:
 The Pac-Man/Little Rascals/Richie Rich Show (September 25, 1982 – September 3, 1983)
 The Pac-Man/Rubik, the Amazing Cube Hour (September 10, 1983 – September 1, 1984)

Since the original run, reruns have turned up on the USA Cartoon Express on USA in the 1980s, Cartoon Network from 1995 to 1999, and Boomerang from 2000 to 2014. The Christmas-themed episode currently airs each year as part of The Boomerang Christmas Party, an annual marathon of classic Christmas cartoons, but otherwise is not included in the channel's rotation. The series is also available for purchase on the Xbox Live Marketplace. In the United Kingdom it was first Broadcast on TVAM as a part of the Roland Rat show.

Home media 
In 1982, Worldvision Home Video Inc. (under Rainbow Products Ltd.) distributed a Pac-Man and Family VHS in Australia (catalogue number RCV 9019) and featured the episodes, Pacula, Trick or Chomp, Super Ghosts, The Pac-Man in the Moon, Invasion of the Pac-Pups, Journey to the Center of Pacland and the special Christmas Comes to Pacland. In 2012, Warner Archive released both seasons of Pac-Man on DVD in region 1 as part of their Hanna–Barbera Classics Collection. The first season was released on January 31, 2012, followed by the release of the second season on September 11, 2012.

See also 
 List of television series based on video games

References

External links 

 

1982 American television series debuts
1983 American television series endings
American Broadcasting Company original programming
1980s American animated television series
Animated series based on video games
Pac-Man
Television series by Hanna-Barbera
Works based on Bandai Namco video games
Animated television series about ghosts
American children's animated adventure television series
American children's animated comedy television series
American children's animated fantasy television series
American animated television spin-offs
English-language television shows